Tori Leigh Trees (born June 6, 1965), later known by her married name Tori Smith, is an American former competition swimmer who represented the United States at the 1984 Summer Olympics in Los Angeles.  She competed in the women's 200-meter backstroke event, and finished fifth in the final with a time of 2:15.73.

Trees attended the University of Texas at Austin, where she competed for coach Richard Quick's Texas Longhorns swimming and diving team in National Collegiate Athletic Association (NCAA) competition.  In 1985, she won the NCAA national championship in the 200-yard backstroke, recording a time of 1:59.11.

See also
 List of University of Texas at Austin alumni

References

1965 births
Living people
American female backstroke swimmers
Olympic swimmers of the United States
Sportspeople from Louisville, Kentucky
Swimmers at the 1984 Summer Olympics
Texas Longhorns women's swimmers